The 2021 ECAC Hockey Men's Ice Hockey Tournament will be the 60th tournament in league history. It was played between March 18 and March 20, 2021.As the tournament champion, St. Lawrence, received an automatic bid to the 2021 NCAA Division I Men's Ice Hockey Tournament.

Format
With the majority of ECAC member schools opting out of competition for the 2020–21 season due to the COVID-19 pandemic, the format for the tournament was reduced to just four participating institutions. The format introduced would have the four programs compete in two single-elimination rounds over the course of one championship weekend. The semifinals will take place on March 18, and the championship game on March 20 at the site of the highest remaining seed.

On March 10, ECAC announced that Clarkson would not be participating in the tournament, due to COVID protocols. As a result, the format of the tournament was further reduced to just three teams. Top-seed Quinnipiac was awarded a bye to the Championship game and St. Lawrence will host Colgate in the lone semifinal.

Conference standings

Bracket

Note: * denotes overtime period(s)

Results

Semifinal

(3) St. Lawrence vs. (4) Colgate

Championship

(1) Quinnipiac vs. (3) St. Lawrence

Tournament awards

Most Outstanding Player(s)
David Jankowski

References

ECAC Tournament
ECAC Hockey Men's Ice Hockey Tournament
ECAC Hockey Men's Ice Hockey Tournament